The Gold Suit (Spanish: El traje de oro) is a 1960 Spanish film directed by Julio Coll.

Cast
 Manuel Alexandre 
 Antonio Borrero 'Chamaco' 
 José Calvo 
 Alberto Closas 
 Marisa de Leza 
 Carlos Larrañaga 
 Rogelio Madrid 
 José Nieto 
 Marisa Prado

References

Bibliography 
 Pascual Cebollada & Luis Rubio Gil. Enciclopedia del cine español: cronología''. Ediciones del Serbal, 1996.

External links 
 

1960 films
Spanish drama films
1960s Spanish-language films
1960s Spanish films